Bryce Bennett, (born November 11, 1984) an American politician from Montana. As a Democrat, he served in the Montana Senate from 2019 to 2021 and represented he 50th senate district based in Missoula, Montana. He previously served in the Montana House of Representatives from 2011 to 2019.

Early life and education
Born in Billings, Montana, Bennett is a fifth-generation Montanan. At a young age, his family moved to Hysham, Montana, then, when Bennett was aged eight, to the Missoula Valley. He attended Lolo Elementary and Big Sky High School, before enrolling at the University of Montana.

Political career
After graduating in 2007, Bennett went to work for the Democratic National Committee in western Montana. Following the 2008 election, Bennett moved to Helena, Montana, and worked for the Montana House Democrats.

When Rep. Robin Hamilton announced that he would not be seeking re-election in 2010, Bennett declared his candidacy for the seat. In the 2010 Democratic Primary Election, Bennett won 85% of the vote, defeating his opponent by more than five-to-one. In the general election held on November 2, Bennett won narrowly: he took 50.4% of the vote while the Republican nominee won 46.9% and the Libertarian 2.7%. He took office in January 2011.

Bryce founded the Montana Privacy Caucus by bringing together Republicans and Democrats in the legislature to combat the overreach of government and corporations into our personal lives. Together, the caucus has passed a series of bills which protect Montanans’ private data.

Bennett served as a Minority Caucus Chair in the 2013-2014 session and Minority Whip of the House during the 2015-2016 session.

The Montana Ambassadors named Bennett ‘Legislator of the Year’ for his work to combat dark money.

2020 Race for Secretary of State

In the 2020 Montana elections, Bennett ran for Secretary of State of Montana. Bennett was uncontested in the Democratic Primary. Christi Jacobsen defeated Bennett, 59.56% to 40.44%.

Personal life
Bennett is openly gay. He is the first openly gay man to serve in the Montana legislature. His 2010 campaign won the support of the Gay & Lesbian Victory Fund.

Bryce was named by The Advocate (LGBT magazine) as one of their ‘40 under 40’.  He was also named to Out (magazine) ‘Power List’ which included “exemplary individuals [who] manage to influence the way others live — either through their public personas, politics, or wealth — and affect cultural and social attitudes.”

References

External links
Legislative homepage

1984 births
21st-century American politicians
Gay politicians
LGBT state legislators in Montana
Living people
Democratic Party members of the Montana House of Representatives
Democratic Party Montana state senators
People from Hysham, Montana
Politicians from Billings, Montana
Politicians from Missoula, Montana
University of Montana alumni
21st-century American LGBT people